In mathematical analysis, the concept of a mean-periodic function is a generalization of the concept of a periodic function introduced in 1935 by Jean Delsarte. Further results were made by Laurent Schwartz.

Definition
Consider a complex-valued function  of a real variable.  The function  is periodic with period  precisely if for all real , we have . This can be written as

 

where  is the difference between the Dirac measures at 0 and a.  The function  is mean-periodic if it satisfies the same equation (1), but where  is some arbitrary nonzero measure with compact (hence bounded) support.

There are several well-known equivalent definitions.

Relation to almost periodic functions
Mean-periodic functions are a separate generalization of periodic functions from the almost periodic functions. For instance, exponential functions are mean-periodic since , but they are not almost periodic as they are unbounded. Still, there is a theorem which states that any uniformly continuous bounded mean-periodic function is almost periodic (in the sense of Bohr). In the other direction, there exist almost periodic functions which are not mean-periodic.

Applications
In work related to the Langlands correspondence, the mean-periodicity of certain (functions related to) zeta functions associated to an arithmetic scheme have been suggested to correspond to automorphicity of the related L-function. There is a certain class of mean-periodic functions arising from number theory.

See also
　almost periodic functions

References

Mathematical analysis